San Andrés Creek (Spanish for: St. Andrew's Creek), now called San Andreas Creek, is a perennial stream that flows  southeasterly along the San Andreas Fault from Sweeney Ridge in San Mateo County, California, providing the inflow to and outflow from San Andreas Reservoir, and then entering Lower Crystal Springs Reservoir, where it was a historic tributary to San Mateo Creek. San Mateo Creek then carries its waters over Crystal Springs Dam northeast to San Francisco Bay.

History

After discovering San Francisco Bay from Sweeney Ridge on November 4, 1769, the Portolà expedition descended what Portolà called the Cañada de San Francisco, now known as San Andreas Creek, to camp just south of the San Mateo Creek canyon on a lake called by him Laguna Grande, now covered by Upper Crystal Springs Reservoir. The campsite is marked by California Historical Marker No. 94 "Portola Expedition Camp". After heading south and descending from the foothills along San Francisquito Creek to established his base camp at El Palo Alto, Portola retraced his steps and returned along San Andreas Creek to recross Sweeney Ridge and then via the coast back to San Diego. The San Andres Creek place name is shown on the Rancho de las Pulgas 1856 plat map. Padre Palóu, on an expedition from Monterey to explore the western side of San Francisco Bay led by Captain Rivera, renamed Portola's Cañada de San Francisco to Cañada de San Andrés on November 30, 1774, it being the feast day of St. Andrew. Captain Juan Bautista de Anza, after forging the first overland route from Monterey, California, to San Francisco Bay, explored the peninsula and selected the sites for Mission San Francisco de Asís (Mission Dolores) and the Presidio of San Francisco. De Anza returned to Monterey via the Cañada de San Andrés and camped on the banks of San Mateo Creek on March 29, 1776. In de Anza's diary on March 29, 1776, he wrote: "Night having fallen, at a quarter past six I went down to the arroyo of San Andreas and to another, that of San Matheo, where it descends to empty into the estuary."

The two Crystal Springs lakes and San Andreas Lake used to be known as Spring Valley Lakes for the Spring Valley Water Company which owned them. The Spring Valley Water Company named the lakes, the Spring Valley Lakes, after the company. The original Spring Valley was between Mason and Taylor Streets, and Washington and Broadway Streets in San Francisco, where the water company started. When the company went south for more water, the Spring Valley name was carried south too.

Watershed
The San Andreas Dam eliminates flow in the creek immediately below the dams, except for occasional spills or releases from the reservoir and seepage through the dam. From San Andreas Reservoir, the creek descends and enters the northeast arm of Lower Crystal Springs Reservoir. Historically San Andreas Creek joined San Mateo Creek just above the current location of the Crystal Springs Dam. The two Crystal Springs lakes and San Andreas Lake used to be known as Spring Valley Lakes for the Spring Valley Water Company, which owned them. Lower Crystal Springs Reservoir now covers the town of Crystal Springs, which grew up around a resort of the same name.

Ecology
Fog drip may play a key role in the precipitation in the upper watershed. He found that the trees most exposed produced the most precipitation and in five weeks of measurement (July 20 – August 28, 1951) fog drip below the tanoak produced  of precipitation, more than the total annual precipitation on nearby grasslands and chaparral. The Douglas fir produced  of fog drip and appeared to provide unique conditions supporting the orchids giant helleborine (Epipactis gigantea) and phantom orchid (Cephalanthera austiniae), since these plants were found exclusively in these moist ridge tops.

See also
List of watercourses in the San Francisco Bay Area
San Andreas Reservoir
San Mateo Creek

References

Rivers of San Mateo County, California
Santa Cruz Mountains
Rivers of Northern California
Tributaries of San Mateo Creek (San Francisco Bay Area)